21st parallel may refer to:

21st parallel north, a circle of latitude in the Northern Hemisphere
21st parallel south, a circle of latitude in the Southern Hemisphere